NNL may refer to:
National Natural Landmark -  a natural history conservation program of the U.S. Secretary of the Interior
National Nuclear Laboratory - the UK's government-owned commercially operated fully customer-funded nuclear technology service provider
Negro National League (1920–1931) - one of the several Negro leagues which were established during the period in the United States in which organized baseball was segregated
Negro National League (1933–1948) - established two years after the first Negro National League had disbanded
Noether normalization lemma - a theorem in commutative algebra